The High Standard HDM is a semiautomatic pistol equipped with an integral suppressor. Based on the High Standard HD model target pistol, it was adopted by the Office of Strategic Services (OSS) during World War II. OSS head Bill Donovan demonstrated the pistol to President Franklin Roosevelt inside the Oval Office. Because of legal concerns during wartime, full-metal-jacketed .22 LR rounds were developed for this pistol.

It is still found in United States inventories, including that of the CIA, United States Marines, and Special Forces. The weapon was also assigned to the Lockheed U-2 pilots.

Overview 
The High Standard HDM is a conventional blowback-operated semiautomatic pistol fitted with an integral suppressor which decreases its report by more than 20 dB.  This pistol design was originally delivered on January 20, 1944, and original contract models were blued with a Parkerized (phosphate) finish on the suppressor.  Follow on models were completely Parkerized.  Post World War II models produced for the CIA were also blued.  The weapon has a frame-mounted safety lever on the left in a similar position to the M1911A1 and Browning Hi-Power.  The front sight is a fixed blade with a square notch fixed rear sight.

This weapon uses a heel-mounted magazine release.  The weapon is effective at short ranges when the low energy of the round fired is taken into account.  The design is simple and typical of the period in which it was designed.

The HDM pistol was also manufactured in Argentina.

See also 
 High Standard Manufacturing Company
 High Standard .22 Pistol
 List of individual weapons of the U.S. Armed Forces
 List of U.S. Army weapons by supply catalog designation (SNL B-32)

References

External links 
 High standard (manufacturer's website)
 Reference at USMC Force Recon Association site 
 Small Arms Review Article
 Modern Firearms - Handguns - High Standard (Hi-Standard) HDM OSS silenced pistol  (accessed 2015-03-14)

Silenced firearms
Semi-automatic pistols of the United States
World War II firearms of the United States
.22 LR pistols
Weapons of the Philippine Army